Buglife – The Invertebrate Conservation Trust (usually referred to simply as Buglife) is a UK-based nature conservation charity.

Structure
Buglife's head office is in Peterborough, England; with additional offices in Scotland, Wales, Northern Ireland and the South West of England.

Buglife is the only organisation in Europe devoted to the conservation of all invertebrates.  Actively working to save the UK's rarest little animals; everything from bees to beetles through to worms and woodlice.

Buglife's aim is to prevent invertebrate extinctions and to maintain sustainable populations of invertebrates in the United Kingdom and beyond.

Operation
Activities undertaken by Buglife fall into the following areas:
 Undertaking and promoting study and research
 Promoting habitat management aimed at maintaining and enhancing invertebrate biodiversity
 Publicising invertebrates

History
In September 2011, Buglife contributed to BBC Radio 4's Saving Species programme.

In 2015, Buglife campaigned successfully to stop a building development which had threatened the critically endangered species Nothophantes horridus (also known as the Horrid ground-weaver).

References

External links
 

2002 establishments in the United Kingdom
Charities based in England
Conservation in the United Kingdom
Entomological organizations
Environmental organisations based in the United Kingdom
Organisations based in Peterborough
Organizations established in 2002